Mehrun Nissa Hassan, commonly known as Mehr Hassan, is an American actress, model, and classical dancer.

Personal life and education
Hassan is the daughter of religious theologian Riffat Hassan. She was born to a Pakistani mother and an Indian father. Mehr is settled in Louisville, Kentucky, though she has performed in films in India and Pakistan, as well. She received her master's degree from the University of Louisville.

Career
Hassan started her dancing career as a stage performer in United States. During her college years, she visited India during summer breaks and began her film career in a Tamil film called Anbe Diana, in which she played the title character. During her stay in India, she also studied acting at the Kishore Namit Kapoor Institute. She continued to work in films while in college, including the award-winning films, Diwali and Dreams. It was on the set of Diwali that Samina Peerzada approached her for her film, Shararat, which was filmed in Pakistan and released in 2003. She has also appeared in the films, The Gold Bracelet (2006) and Heart Land (2009).

Hassan is an accomplished dancer and has worked in award-winning music videos as a dancer and director.

Partial filmography

Music videos
 Directed and performed (vocals and dance) in Kuch Nahi Terey Bin
 Co-directed and performed (vocals and dance) in Man Mohna (My Spirit)
 Performed (vocals and dance) in Piya Nain Milla

References

External links
 
 
 
 

Living people
Pakistani film actresses
Pakistani emigrants to the United States
University of Louisville alumni
American film actresses
Actresses from Louisville, Kentucky
Year of birth missing (living people)
Pakistani female models
Actresses from Lahore
21st-century Pakistani actresses
American female dancers
American models of Pakistani descent
American female models of Indian descent
Dancers from Kentucky